Alexei Prokopievich Berest ((Oleksiy Prokopovych Berest); March 9, 1921 – November 4, 1970) was a Soviet political officer and one of the three Red Army soldiers who hoisted the Victory Banner.

Biography

Early life
Born to an impoverished Ukrainian family, seven of Berest's fifteen siblings died prematurely. He was orphaned when eleven years old, and raised by his older sisters. From the age of sixteen, he worked as a tractor driver. Berest volunteered into the Red Army in October 1939 and took part in the Soviet-Finnish War as a signaller. When Germany invaded the Soviet Union, he was sent to the front once more. In March 1943, while stationed in the Volkhov Front, Corporal Berest joined the Communist Party. In December, he was sent to the Leningrad Military-Political School (Which at the time was located at Shuya, after being evacuated) and trained as a commissar. After graduation in September 1944, Lieutenant Berest was assigned as Captain Stepan Neustroev's deputy for political affairs (Zampolit) in the 1st Battalion of the 150th Rifle Division's 756th Regiment.

Battle of Berlin
On 30 April 1945, after long days of street combat in Berlin, the 150th Division attacked the Reichstag. On 1 May, at about 03:00, Berest and two scouts - Meliton Kantaria and Mikhail Yegorov - hoisted one of nine Soviet flags given to the division's commanders on the building's dome, fastening it to Wilhelm I's statue. Although not the first to be placed, the flag was eventually proclaimed as the Victory Banner. Later, posing as a Colonel, he negotiated with the German garrison of the Reichstag on the terms of their surrender. He received the Order of the Red Banner for his actions.

Post-war years
In May 1945, Neustroev, Kantaria and many others who were involved in the Reichstag assault were awarded the title Hero of the Soviet Union. For unknown reasons, Berest did not attain the award and his part in the operation was silenced. In 1948, he was discharged from the army and began working in the regional cinema department of Rostov-on-Don. In 1953, he was convicted of embezzlement and sent to ten years in prison, of which he served five. After being released, he was employed in the local Rostselmash factory as a common laborer. On 3 November 1970, Berest was run over by a train as he saved a child who strayed on the railway. He died of his injuries in the early hours of the following day.

He was posthumously granted the title Hero of Ukraine on 6 May 2005.

Honours and awards
 Order of the Red Banner
 Order of the Patriotic War, 1st class
 Order of the Red Star
 Order of the "Gold Star" Hero of Ukraine – for military valour in the Great Patriotic War of 1941–1945, the personal courage and heroism displayed in the Berlin operation and installation of the Victory Banner over the Reichstag, posthumously)
 Medal "For the Victory over Germany in the Great Patriotic War 1941–1945"
 Medal "For the Capture of Berlin"

References

Annotations

External links
Oleksi Berest on the Heroes of the Ukraine website.
Oleksi Berest on a Sumy newspaper website.

1921 births
1970 deaths
People from Sumy Oblast
Soviet military personnel of World War II from Ukraine
Communist Party of the Soviet Union members
Railway accident deaths in Russia
Recipients of the Order of Gold Star (Ukraine)
Recipients of the Order of the Red Banner
People convicted of embezzlement
People nominated for the title Hero of the Soviet Union